Ville de Bordeaux was one of three second-rank, 90-gun, steam-powered  ships of the line built for the French Navy in the 1850s. The ship participated in the Second French intervention in Mexico in 1859 and served as a prison ship for Communard prisoners in 1871–1872 after the Paris Commune was crushed by the French government. She became a school ship in 1880 and was scrapped in 1894.

Description
The Ville de Nantes-class ships were repeats of the preceding ship of the line  and were also designed by naval architect Henri Dupuy de Lôme. Their crew numbered 913 officers and ratings.

The Ville de Nantes class were powered by a pair of four-cylinder steam engines that drove the single propeller shaft using steam provided by eight boilers. The ships were fitted with three masts and ship rigged.

As of 1862 Ville de Bordeaux was armed with twenty-four 30-pounder smoothbore cannon and ten  rifled muzzle-loading (RML) guns on the lower gundeck. On the upper gundeck were twenty-four 30-pounder cannon and ten  Paixhans guns. Distributed between the quarterdeck and forecastle were twenty  Paixhans guns and a pair of 163 mm MLR guns.

Career 
Ville de Bordeaux conducted trials in 1861 before being put in ordinary. Reactivated under Captain Delangle de Cary in 1862 for the Second French intervention in Mexico, she served for three years before returning to the ordinary. She was reactivated again, this time under Commander Mer, to bring back the French troops in Mexico back to France in 1867.

After the Paris Commune, Ville de Bordeaux was used as a prison hulk in Brest. In January 1880, she was renamed Bretagne and replaced Bretagne as a boys' schoolship, role which retained until 1894, when Fontenoy, also renamed Bretagne, took her place.

Citations

References

Ships of the line of the French Navy
1860 ships
Napoléon-class ships of the line
Ville de Nantes-class ships of the line